Gerberoy is a commune in the Oise department in northern France, in the old pays of Beauvaisis.

Toponymy 
Gerboredum 11th Century. Germanic masculine name Gerbold and Old North French roy 'ford' (Celtic rito-, Old Welsh rit > Welsh rhyd).

A ford in the Thérain stream.

History 
The old village with many half-timbered houses, and  traces of the medieval castle, is listed in the plus beaux villages de France (Most beautiful French villages).

The siege and battle of Gerberoy was fought between William the Conqueror and his son Robert Curthose in the winter of 1078–79.

See also
 Communes of the Oise department

References

Communes of Oise
Plus Beaux Villages de France